Peter Glemser (born 12 December 1940) is a former German cyclist. He competed in the team time trial at the 1964 Summer Olympics. He won the German National Road Race in 1969.

References

1940 births
Living people
German male cyclists
Olympic cyclists of the United Team of Germany
Cyclists at the 1964 Summer Olympics
German cycling road race champions
Sportspeople from Stuttgart
Cyclists from Baden-Württemberg
20th-century German people